The foreign relations of the Islamic Republic of Mauritania have, since 1960, been dominated by the issues of the Spanish Sahara (now Western Sahara or Sahrawi Arab Democratic Republic) and the recognition of its independence by its neighbours, particularly Morocco. Mauritania's foreign relations are handled by the Minister for Foreign Affairs and Cooperation, who is currently Ismail Ould Cheikh Ahmed.

History

Previously a colony of France, Mauritania gained independence in 1960, although this was disapproved of by the Arab League due to Morocco's claims on the Western Sahara. Mauritania applied to join the United Nations in 1960 but was vetoed by the Soviet Union, who voted the next year for Mauritania's admission in exchange for the admission of Mongolia.

Initially, Mauritania continued good relations with France to counterbalance Morocco's ambitions, but by 1962 the country turned away from wholesale support of France and began normalising relations with its neighbours, eventually establishing diplomatic relations with Mali in 1963 through the Treaty of Kayes, and with Algeria and the United Arab Republic in 1964. In 1963, Mauritania joined the Organization of African Unity (OAU), which led to Morocco's resignation (Morocco did not recognize Mauritania until 1969). With the OAU's and Arab League's encouragement, Mauritania did not seek diplomatic relations with Portugal, Israel or apartheid South Africa; today, following the downfall of the Apartheid system and the decolonization of Portugal's empire, relations with these countries have been normalised.

Claims to Western Sahara territory

In 1976, Mauritania annexed a third of the then Spanish Sahara following Spain's withdrawal from the region. Algeria and Morocco responded by withdrawing their ambassadors from Mauritania; additionally, the rebel Polisario group began a guerilla war against both Mauritania and Morocco. Mauritania withdrew its claims and recognized the Sahrawi Arab Democratic Republic (SADR) as the territory's sovereign government in 1979, although this allowed Morocco to take control of the SADR. Mauritania has since declared neutrality in the dispute, seeking a peaceful and expedient end to the conflict, while its diplomatic relations with Algeria and Morocco have resumed.

African Union membership
Mauritania joined the African Union (AU) in 1963. Following a military coup d'état in 2005, Mauritania's membership was suspended "until the restoration of constitutional order in the country". This left Mauritania diplomatically isolated within Africa, as it became the only country on the continent except Morocco without full membership in the AU.

In March 2007 democratic rule was restored in Mauritania, with presidential elections declared "free and fair" by international observers. However, its membership was suspended again following the 2008 coup.

Relations by country

See also

References